Encores is a live album by American popular music singer-songwriter Jimmy Buffett.  The set list includes twenty two songs compiled from Buffett's intimate second encores, with which he ends his concerts. All songs are taken from the 2008/2009 tours.  Unlike other live albums by Buffett, Encores features few standards and Songs You Know by Heart tunes, making the album less mainstream among fans.

The album was recorded during the 2008 "Year of Still Here Tour," with the exception of "He Went To Paris" and "A Pirate Looks at Forty," which were recorded in 2009 in Paris and Waikiki, respectively.

Track listing

Disc 1
1. "Come Monday"(Jimmy Buffett) 3:59
Jimmy Buffett, Robert Greenidge, Ralph MacDonald, Mac McAnally. Houston, Texas April 21, 2008
2. "Tin Cup Chalice"(Jimmy Buffett) 3:54
Jimmy solo. Manassas, Virginia 9/1/08
3. "Growing Older But Not Up"(Jimmy Buffett) 4:02
Jimmy, Robert, Ralph, Mac. Las Vegas, Nevada October 18, 2008
4. "Coast of Carolina"(Jimmy Buffett and Mac McAnally) 4:51 
Jimmy, Peter Mayer, Mac.  Raleigh, North Carolina 6/7/08
5. "Paradise"(John Prine) 4:01
Jimmy, Mac. Cincinnati, Ohio July 17, 2008
6. "Do You Know What It Means to Miss New Orleans?"(Eddie DeLange and Louis Alter) 4:27 
Jimmy, Allen Toussaint on piano.  Jazz Fest, New Orleans, Louisiana 5/3/08
7. "Nautical Wheelers"(Jimmy Buffett) 3:48 
Jimmy Solo. Mansfield, Massachusetts 9/4/08
8. "Trying To Reason With Hurricane Season"(Jimmy Buffett) 5:07
Jimmy Solo.  Mansfield, Massachusetts 9/6/08
9. "Banana Republics"(Steve Goodman) 5:28
Jimmy, Robert, Ralph, Mac. Chula Vista, CA October 16, 2008
10. "He Went To Paris"(Jimmy Buffett) 4:27
Jimmy Solo. Paris, France September 26, 2009
11. "Last Mango in Paris"(Jimmy Buffett, Marshall Chapman, Will Jennings, and Michael Utley) 4:18
Jimmy Solo.  Atlantic City, New Jersey August 24, 2008

Disc 2
1. "L'air De La Louisiane"(Jesse Winchester) 3:05
Jimmy Solo.  Margaritaville, New Orleans, LA 5/1/08
2. "Reggaebilly Hill"(Michael Garrett) 3:56
Jimmy Solo.  Manassas, VA August 30, 2008
3. "Coast Of Marseilles"(Keith Sykes)4:45
Jimmy, Robert, Ralph, Peter, Tina Gullickson, Nadirah Shakoor, Mac.  Mountain View, California October 21, 2008
4. "Lovely Cruise"(Jonathan Baham) 3:22
Jimmy Solo.  Las Vegas, NV October 25, 2008
5. "Oyster and Pearls"(Jimmy Buffett and Mac McAnally) 4:02
Jimmy, Mac on Piano.  Wantagh, New York August 27, 2008
6. "Wildflowers"(Tom Petty) 4:05
Jimmy, Peter, Mac.  Las Vegas, NV October 25, 2008
7. "Defying Gravity"(Jesse Winchester) 3:14
Jimmy Solo.  Philadelphia, Pennsylvania June 14, 2008
8. "It's A Big Old Goofy World"(John Prine) 5:01
Jimmy Solo.  Chicago, Illinois July 24, 2008
9. "Death of an Unpopular Poet"(Jimmy Buffett) 3:14
Jimmy Solo.  Pittsburgh, PA July 22, 2008
10. "Blowin' in the Wind"(Bob Dylan) 4:15
Jimmy Solo.  Newport, Rhode Island 8/3/08
11. "A Pirate Looks at Forty"(Jimmy Buffett) 5:02
Jimmy, Jake Shimabukuro. Waikiki, Hawaii February 28, 2009

Notes

External links
Encores – the new Jimmy Buffett album at Margaritaville.com

2010 live albums
Jimmy Buffett live albums
Mailboat Records live albums